Farmville is a community in southeastern Chatham County, North Carolina, United States, which was once called Coal Glen.  The area was the site of coal mining activities from the 18th century up the mid-1950s, and was the site of the 1925 Coal Glen mine disaster.

By the time of the 1925 disaster, the town consisted of several homes and a company store.

A historical marker noting the mine disaster was dedicated June 3, 2017 at Farmville Community Church at U.S. 15-501 and Walter Bright Road north of Sanford.

Geography

References 

UNC Library: This Month in North Carolina History: The Coal Glen Mine Disaster
William S. Powell, The North Carolina Gazetteer (Chapel Hill: UNC Press, 1968).

External links
Coal Glen Mine Disaster website

Unincorporated communities in Chatham County, North Carolina
Unincorporated communities in North Carolina